The West Point Consolidated School District (WPCSD), formerly the West Point School District, is a public school district based in West Point, Mississippi (USA).

Effective July 1, 2015 the West Point School District and the Clay County School District was consolidated into the West Point Consolidated School District.

Schools
Schools are in West Point unless otherwise noted.
West Point High School (Grades 8-12)
West Point Career & Technology Center
Fifth Street School (Grades 5-7)
West Clay Elementary School (grades K-6) – Cedar Bluff
South Side Elementary School (Grades 3-4)
Church Hill Elementary School (Grades 1-2)
East Side Elementary School (Pre-Kindergarten and Kindergarten)

Former schools:
Central Middle School (Grades 5-6)
Catherine Bryan School (Pre-Kindergarten & Special Education)
West Side School (Grades K-12)

Demographics

2007-08 school year
There were a total of 3,451 students enrolled in the West Point School District during the 2007–2008 school year. The gender makeup of the district was 50% female and 50% male. The racial makeup of the district was 79.83% African American, 19.33% White, 0.64% Hispanic, 0.17% Asian, and 0.03% Native American.

Previous school years

Accountability statistics

Sports facts 
1982 Class 2A state football champions

1987 Class 4A state baseball champions

1987 Class 4A state football champions

1988 Class 4A state football champions

1989 Class 5A state football champions

2005 Class 4A state football champions

2009 Class 5A state football champions

2010 Class 5A state football champions

2016 Class 5A state football champions

2017 Class 5A state football champions

2018 Class 5A state football champions

2019 Class 5A state football champions

Famous alumni 

 Vontarrius Dora  professional football player
 Brandon Walker  Barstool Sports personality

See also
List of school districts in Mississippi

References

External links
 
 Map of school districts in Clay County, MS in 2010 - U.S. Census Bureau

Education in Clay County, Mississippi
School districts in Mississippi
School districts established in 2015